Floßbach may refer to the following streams or river in Germany:

 Floßbach (Eckbach), left tributary of the Eckbach in Rhineland-Palatinate 
 Floßbach (Isenach), right tributary of the Isenach in Rhineland-Palatinate 
 Floßbach (Mohrbach), right tributary of the Mohrbach in Rhineland-Palatinate 
 Floßbach (Speyerbach), left side arm of the Speyerbach in Rhineland-Palatinate 
 Floßbach (Krähenbach, upper course), upper course of the Krähenbach on the main left arm near Krähenbach, Löffingen, county of Breisgau-Hochschwarzwald, Baden-Württemberg, into which the Gauchach flows
 Floßbach (Krähenbach, tributary) right tributary of the Krähenbach below Krähenbach, Löffingen, county of Breisgau-Hochschwarzwald, Baden-Württemberg, to which the Gauchach flows

See  also:

 Floß, a municipality in the district of Neustadt (Waldnaab), Bavaria, Germany